Fenimorea petiti is a species of sea snail, a marine gastropod mollusk in the family Drilliidae.

Description
The shell grows to a length of 18 mm.

Distribution
This species occurs in the demersal zone of the Gulf of Mexico (Florida) at a depths of 59 m.

References

 Rosenberg, G., F. Moretzsohn, and E. F. García. 2009. Gastropoda (Mollusca) of the Gulf of Mexico, Pp. 579–699 in Felder, D.L. and D.K. Camp (eds.), Gulf of Mexico–Origins, Waters, and Biota. Biodiversity. Texas A&M Press, College Station, Texas
  Tucker, J.K. 2004 Catalog of recent and fossil turrids (Mollusca: Gastropoda). Zootaxa 682:1–1295

External links

petiti
Gastropods described in 1995